The 1999 Stanley Cup playoffs, the playoff tournament of the National Hockey League (NHL), began on April 21, 1999, following the 1998–99 NHL season. The sixteen teams that qualified, eight from each conference, played best-of-seven series for conference quarter-finals, semi-finals and championships, and then the conference champions played a best-of-seven series for the Stanley Cup. This was the first time since 1987, and only time until 2020 where all former WHA teams clinched the playoffs.

Despite his team being eliminated in the Conference Finals, Colorado Avalanche forward Peter Forsberg's postseason scoring totals, with 24 points in 19 games, were not surpassed for the remainder of the 1999 playoffs. This made him the first player to lead all playoff scorers despite not making the Finals since 1986 when Doug Gilmour and Bernie Federko each tallied 21 points in 19 postseason games for the St. Louis Blues who were also eliminated in the Conference Finals.

The playoffs ended on June 19, 1999, with the Dallas Stars defeating the Buffalo Sabres to win their first Stanley Cup championship in their history. Brett Hull scored a triple overtime goal in game six for Dallas, while Joe Nieuwendyk was awarded the Conn Smythe Trophy as the MVP of the playoffs.

Playoff seeds

The following teams qualified for the playoffs:

Eastern Conference
 New Jersey Devils, Atlantic Division champions, Eastern Conference regular season champions – 105 points
 Ottawa Senators, Northeast Division champions – 103 points
 Carolina Hurricanes, Southeast Division champions – 86 points
 Toronto Maple Leafs – 97 points
 Philadelphia Flyers – 93 points
 Boston Bruins – 91 points (39 wins)
 Buffalo Sabres – 91 points (37 wins)
 Pittsburgh Penguins – 90 points

Western Conference
 Dallas Stars, Pacific Division champions, Western Conference regular season champions, Presidents' Trophy winners – 114 points
 Colorado Avalanche, Northwest Division champions – 98 points
 Detroit Red Wings, Central Division champions – 93 points
 Phoenix Coyotes – 90 points
 St. Louis Blues – 87 points
 Mighty Ducks of Anaheim – 83 points
 San Jose Sharks – 80 points
 Edmonton Oilers – 78 points

Playoff bracket
With the NHL expanding to a six-division setup for this season, the division winners now occupied the top three spots.

Conference Quarterfinals

Eastern Conference Quarterfinals

(1) New Jersey Devils vs. (8) Pittsburgh Penguins

This was the fourth playoff meeting between these two teams; with Pittsburgh winning two of the three previous series. They last met in the 1995 Eastern Conference Semifinals, where New Jersey won in five games.

(2) Ottawa Senators vs. (7) Buffalo Sabres

This was the second playoff meeting between these two teams. Their only previous meeting was in the 1997 Eastern Conference Quarterfinals, where Buffalo won in seven games.

(3) Carolina Hurricanes vs. (6) Boston Bruins

This was the third playoff meeting between these two teams, with Boston winning both previous series. They last met in the 1991 Adams Division Semifinals where Boston defeated the Hartford Whalers in six games. This was the first playoff series for the Whalers/Hurricanes franchise since moving to Carolina in 1997. Game five was the last ever game played at The Greensboro Coliseum Complex. This was the only playoff series to be played in the arena.

(4) Toronto Maple Leafs vs. (5) Philadelphia Flyers

This was the fourth playoff meeting between these two teams; with Philadelphia winning all three previous series. They last met in the 1977 Stanley Cup Quarterfinals, where Philadelphia won in six games.

Western Conference Quarterfinals

(1) Dallas Stars vs. (8) Edmonton Oilers

This was the third consecutive playoff meeting and the fifth overall playoff match-up between these two teams; with the teams splitting the four previous series. Dallas won last year's Western Conference Semifinals in five games.

(2) Colorado Avalanche vs. (7) San Jose Sharks

This was the first playoff meeting between these two teams. Colorado won three of the four games during this year's regular season series. Due to the Columbine High School massacre games one and two were played in San Jose, while games three and four were played in Colorado.

(3) Detroit Red Wings vs. (6) Mighty Ducks of Anaheim

This was the second playoff meeting between these two teams. Their only previous meeting was in the 1997 Western Conference Semifinals, where Detroit won in a four-game sweep.

(4) Phoenix Coyotes vs. (5) St. Louis Blues

This was the second playoff meeting between these two teams. Their only previous meeting was in the 1982 Norris Division Semifinals, where St. Louis defeated the original Winnipeg Jets in four games.

Conference Semifinals

Eastern Conference Semifinals

(4) Toronto Maple Leafs vs. (8) Pittsburgh Penguins

This was the third playoff meeting between these two teams; with Toronto winning both previous series. They last met in the 1977 Preliminary Round, where Toronto won in three games.

(6) Boston Bruins vs. (7) Buffalo Sabres

This was the seventh playoff meeting between these two teams; with Boston winning five of the six previous series. They last met in the 1993 Adams Division Semifinals, where Buffalo won in a four-game sweep.

Western Conference Semifinals

(1) Dallas Stars vs. (5) St. Louis Blues

This was the eleventh playoff meeting between these two teams; with the teams splitting the ten previous series. They last met in the 1994 Western Conference Quarterfinals, where Dallas won in a four-game sweep.

(2) Colorado Avalanche vs. (3) Detroit Red Wings

This was the third playoff meeting between these two teams; with the teams splitting the two previous series. They last met in the 1997 Western Conference Finals, where Detroit won in six games.

Conference Finals

Eastern Conference Final

(4) Toronto Maple Leafs vs. (7) Buffalo Sabres

This was the first playoff meeting between these two teams. Toronto made their third appearance in the Conference Finals and first since losing to Vancouver in five games in 1994 Western Conference Final. Buffalo made their second consecutive and second overall appearance in the Conference Finals after losing to Washington in six games the last year's Eastern Conference Final.

The Sabres defeated the Maple Leafs in five games. In game one the Sabres backup goaltender Dwayne Roloson filled in for the injured Dominik Hasek. Leading 3–2 midway through the game Toronto appeared to be in control, but Stu Barnes tied the game for Buffalo at 14:37 of the second period. The Sabres went on to score twice in the third period on goals by Curtis Brown and Geoff Sanderson, as Buffalo held on to win 5–4. In game two the Maple Leafs got two goals 18 seconds apart in the first period as Steve Sullivan and Sylvain Cote scored. Toronto held a 4–3 lead halfway through the third period with Buffalo pressing, the Maple Leafs scored twice to seal a 6–3 win. Dominik Hasek returned for the Sabres in game three but it was the away team that netted the first goal as Maple Leafs forward Yanic Perreault scored late in the first period. Buffalo was not to be denied and they scored three goals early in the second period and the Sabres held on to win the game 4–2. Buffalo came out flying again in game four holding a 5–0 lead after two periods. Hasek's shutout bid was erased when Mats Sundin scored on a penalty shot; Buffalo won the game 5–2, as Dominik Hasek made 31 saves in the victory. After a scoreless first period Steve Sullivan got Toronto on the board first in game five, the teams traded goals in the second period and the game was tied 2–2 going into the third period. Erik Rasmussen broke the tie with a goal in the middle of the third period and Dixon Ward added a late shorthanded empty net goal as the Sabres went on to win 4–2 and take the series four games to one. The Sabres advanced to the Stanley Cup Finals for the first time since 1975.

Western Conference Final

(1) Dallas Stars vs. (2) Colorado Avalanche

This was the first playoff meeting between these two teams. Dallas made their second consecutive and fourth overall Conference Finals appearance after losing to Detroit in six games in last year's Western Conference Final. Colorado made their third Conference Finals appearance in four years and their fifth appearance overall; they last made it to the Conference Finals in the 1997 Western Conference Final, where they lost in six games to Detroit.

In game one the Stars jumped out to a 1–0 lead on Brett Hull's goal at 8:42 of the first period. The Avalanche came back to tie the game in the second period on Peter Forsberg's goal at 14:07. Valeri Kamensky scored the go ahead goal with 5:58 remaining in the game, as Colorado hung on to win 2–1. With the score tied at 2–2 in game two Joe Nieuwendyk gave Dallas a 3–2 lead with a goal at 11:52 of the third period. Mike Modano added a power-play goal with 3:32 remaining as the Stars won 4–2 to tie the series at 1–1. In game three Ed Belfour stopped all 34 Colorado shots he faced and Dallas won 3–0. The Avalanche came back in game four and led 2–1 with under five minutes remaining in the third period until Brett Hull scored at 16:07 to tie the score and send the game into overtime. In the extra period 22-year-old rookie Chris Drury scored at 19:29 to give Colorado a 3–2 win and tie the series at two games apiece.

Game five was the highest scoring game in the series as the two teams combined for 12 goals on just 56 shots. Chris Drury and Valeri Kamensky both scored twice as the Avalanche won 7–5. In game six Claude Lemieux got the Avalanche on the board first at 19:25 of the first period. The Stars responded early in the second on Jere Lehtinen's goal at 1:55. In the third period Jamie Langenbrunner scored twice at 6:49 and again at 17:15, 14 seconds later Richard Matvichuk scored to give Dallas a 4–1 lead which they hung on to. Ed Belfour stopped 26 of 27 Colorado shots (game six was the last NHL game to be played at the McNichols Arena as the Avalanche moved into the new Pepsi Center at the start of next season). The Stars dominated game seven building a 4–0 lead in the first 46 minutes and 18 seconds of the game. Mike Keane scored twice and Jamie Langenbrunner and Jere Lehtinen both had goals. Joe Sakic scored for Colorado with a goal at 13:58 of the third period. Dallas hung on and won the game 4–1 and the series four games to three. With the win the Stars advanced to the Cup Finals for the first time since 1991 when they were the Minnesota North Stars.

Stanley Cup Finals

This was the third playoff meeting between these two teams; with the teams splitting the two previous series. They last met in the 1981 Stanley Cup Quarterfinals, where the Minnesota North Stars won in five games. Dallas made their third Finals appearance. Buffalo made their second Finals appearance. These teams split their two-game regular season series. This was the first Finals since  to feature two teams that had not previously won the Stanley Cup, this did not occur again until .

Playoff statistics

Skaters
These are the top eleven skaters based on points.

Goaltenders
This is a combined table of the top five goaltenders based on goals against average and the top five goaltenders based on save percentage, with at least 420 minutes played. The table is sorted by GAA, and the criteria for inclusion are bolded.

See also
 1998–99 NHL season
 List of Stanley Cup champions

References

playoffs
Stanley Cup playoffs